Lisa Mercedez is a Jamaican dancehall recording artist, singer, and songwriter. She is best known for her collaborations with Stylo G, Vybz Kartel, Ms Banks, and touring with Nicki Minaj

Early life
Lisa, whose real name is Alicia, was born in Kingston, Jamaica. She was raised by her father in the community of Red Hills in Kingston and attended Hydel High School. Her father died when she was 16 years old, which led her to relocate to London.

Career
Mercedez's career started in 2005, when she was introduced to Stylo G with whom she later collaborated in under the Stylo G led group 'Warning Crew' becoming the first and only female member.
She coined her stage name 'Lisa Mercedez' as a tribute to her father, who was obsessed with his old Mercedes-Benz W201.

Mercedez moved on to become a solo artist and debuted with her first single 'Lets Get Drunk' in 2014 which was produced by DJ S.K.T. She took a hiatus from music before releasing numerous singles and her first mixtape BGC in 2017.

In February 2018, it was revealed that Mercedez would be one of only three women to perform at Wireless Festival in 2018. This caused controversy, leading to artist Lily Allen and DJ Annie Mac criticising the festival for its lack of diversity. Mercedez commented on the subject that "As a woman we have to work ten times as hard as the guys to make it".

Personal life
On 3 March 2020 she announced her conversion to Islam on Instagram. The singer received death threats as she planned to continue her dancehall career.

Discography

Singles

As Featured Artist

Mixtapes
BGC (2017)

References

Black British women rappers
English women rappers
Jamaican women rappers
Living people
Musicians from Kingston, Jamaica
British women rappers
British reggae musicians
Jamaican emigrants to the United Kingdom
Rappers from London
Year of birth missing (living people)